The  is a DC electric multiple unit (EMU) train type operated by the private railway operator Fuji Kyuko (Fujikyu) on  limited-stop services on the Fujikyuko Line in Yamanashi Prefecture, Japan, since July 2014.

Design
The three-car train was converted from a former Odakyu 20000 series RSE 7-car "Romancecar" EMU built in 1991, withdrawn in March 2012, and purchased by Fujikyu in November 2013. Like the 2000 series trains it supersedes, the exterior of the train is covered in "Mount Fuji" caricatures.

Operations
The train replaced one of the operator's 2000 series sets, which were both rebuilt from the former JR East 165 series Panorama Express Alps Joyful Train excursion EMU sets.

Formation
The sole three-car set is formed as shown below, with car 1 at the Fujisan end.

 KuMoRo 8001 was converted from former Odakyu car DeHa 20002, SaRo 8101 was converted from former SaHa 200052, and KuMoRo 8051 was converted from former DeHa 20302.
 Car 1 is designated as an observation car requiring payment of a supplementary fare, while cars 2 and 3 are designated as non-reserved seating.
 Cars 1 and 3 are each fitted with an FPS33F single-arm pantograph.

Interior
Car 1 has an observation lounge area with sofa seating immediately behind the driver's position. Fixed 4-person facing seating bays with tables are situated at the end of the car. Car 2 has a wheelchair-accessible seating area and a universal access toilet.

History

Fujikyu first announced in January 2012 that it intended to purchase a former Odakyu 20000 series RSE EMU set following its retirement in March of that year. All seven cars of the former set 20002 were moved to the Nippon Sharyo factory in Toyokawa, Aichi, in November 2013 for conversion work. Following conversion, the reformed 3-car train was moved to Fujikyu in April 2014.

Between April and May 2014, Fujikyu held a public vote for the Mount Fuji caricatures to be used on the exterior of the new train, with 44 different designs selected together with 14 new designs submitted by the general public.

Test running of the train still in plain all-over white livery commenced in June 2014. The 8000 series set entered revenue service from 12 July 2014.

References

External links

 June 2014 press release 

Electric multiple units of Japan
Train-related introductions in 2014

ja:小田急20000形電車#富士急行への譲渡
1500 V DC multiple units of Japan
Kawasaki multiple units